Lithium tetrahydridogallate is the inorganic compound with formula LiGaH4. It is a white solid similar to but less thermally robust than lithium aluminium hydride.

Synthesis 
Lithium tetrahydridogallate was first reported by Finholt, Bond and Schlesinger.  It is prepared by the reaction of lithium hydride and an ethereal solution of gallium trichloride:
 GaCl3 + 4 LiH → LiGaH4 + 3 LiCl

The reactants are combined at -80 °C and then allowed to get to room temperature. Higher yields (80-95%) and reaction rates are possible by using gallium tribromide.

Properties 
Lithium tetrahydridogallate is easily dissolved in diethyl ether with which it forms a stable complex, making removal of the solvent difficult. Ethereal solutions of LiGaH4 are indefinitely stable if sealed in glass vessels at 0 °C. Lithium tetrahydridogallate can also be dissolved in tetrahydrofuran and diglyme.

Lithium tetrahydridogallate slowly decomposes at room temperature. The decomposition is fast at 70 °C and the reaction produces lithium hydride, gaseous hydrogen and metallic gallium. The reaction is autocatalyzed by the small particles of metallic gallium being formed.

Reactivity 
It can be generally stated that lithium tetrahydridogallate's reactivity is similar to lithium tetrahydridoaluminate's reactivity, but the first is less stable. This is due to the susceptibility of the gallium-hydrogen bonds to hydrolysis. As a consequence LiGaH4 is usually prepared in the absence of air.

Lithium tetrahydridogallate violently reacts with water by releasing 4 moles of gaseous hydrogen. It can generally be stated that lithium gallium hydride reacts with protic solvents.

Ethereal solutions of LiGaH4 are strongly reductant but less than LiBH4 and LiAlH4. It reacts with primary and secondary amines to release gaseous hydrogen. LiGaH4 reduces acetamide and acetonitrile to ethylamine. Aliphatic acids, aldehydes and ketones are reduced to the corresponding alcohols. Aromatic nitriles, aldehydes, ketones and esters are not reduced.

Usage
Lithium gallium hydride is often used to prepare other complex gallium hydrides. For example, it can be used to convert thallium trichloride  into thallium tetrahydrogallate (which appears as a white solid powder that decomposes above -90 °C) and silver perchlorate into silver tetrahydrogallate (which appears as an orange-reddish solid powder that rapidly decomposes in ethereal solution above -75 °C). In the first case the reaction is carried out at a temperature of -115 °C, in the latter the reaction is carried out at -100 °C.

Reacting lithium gallium hydride and sodium hydride or potassium hydride yields respectively the more stable sodium tetrahydrogallate (decomposes in argon atmosphere at 165 °C) and potassium tetrahydrogallate (decomposes at about 230 °C). Both appear as white crystalline powders e can be preserved in the absence of water and moisture for more than one year.

Digallane is produced by reaction between lithium tetrahydrogallate and monochlorogallane.

References 

Lithium compounds
Gallium compounds
Hydrides